Jonathan Douglas (born 1981) is Irish footballer

Jon or Jonathan Douglas(s) may refer to:

Jonathon Douglass (born 1981) Australian Christian musician at the Hillsong Church

Jon Douglas (1936–2010), American tennis player and American football quarterbacker

See also
John Douglas (disambiguation)